Juhkentali is a subdistrict in the district of Kesklinn (Midtown), Tallinn, the capital of Estonia. It has a population of 1,221.

History
Pleekmäe, a suburb (vorstadt), which located on the shore of the Härjapea, was first mentioned in 1536 as Bleke. The subdistrict nowadays known as Juhkentali, was passed by the Härjapea.

Gallery

See also
Tallinn Bus Station
Kalevi Keskstaadion
Kalevi Spordihall
Tallinn Sports Hall
Siselinna Cemetery
Defence Forces Cemetery of Tallinn
Single Signal Battalion
Cooperative Cyber Defence Centre of Excellence

References

Subdistricts of Tallinn
Kesklinn, Tallinn